Fubon Financial football club may refer to:
 The 2006 name of the Taiwan National Sports Training Center football team
 The 2007–2008 name of the Chinese Taipei national under-23 football team